Salikhovo (Sälix) is a rural locality (a selo) in Yamadinsky Selsoviet, Yanaulsky District, Bashkortostan, Russia. The population was 345 as of 2010. There are 6 streets.

Geography 
Salikhovo is located 43 km southeast of Yanaul (the district's administrative centre) by road. Yugamash is the nearest rural locality.

References 

Rural localities in Yanaulsky District